Ali Rıza Artunkal (1885–1959) was a Turkish politician and former government minister. He was the Minister of National Defence between 1941 and 1946. He was also a member of the early Young Turks Turanist movement.

References 

1885 births
1959 deaths
People from Plovdiv
20th-century Turkish politicians
Turkish Army generals
Turkish military personnel of the Turkish War of Independence
Turkish military personnel of the Greco-Turkish War (1919–1922)